Blaniulus troglodites is a species of millipede in the Blaniulidae family that can be found in France, Spain, and on the island of Sardinia.

References

Julida
Millipedes of Europe
Animals described in 1898